Bernard Morel may refer to:
 Bernard Morel (fencer)
 Bernard Morel (economist)